Chad Costello (born July 22, 1986) is an American professional ice hockey player and coach. He is currently the head coach of the Allen Americans in the ECHL.

Playing career
Costello played junior hockey with the Cedar Rapids RoughRiders where he scored 76 points to be the leading scoring in the United States Hockey League for the 2005–06 season. He then attended Northeastern University where he played NCAA Division I college hockey with the Northeastern Huskies men's ice hockey team where he scored 14 goals and 21 assists for 35 points in 59 games.

In 2008–09, Costello played 65 games with the Muskegon Lumberjacks of the International Hockey League. In the following season, Costello signed with the Tulsa Oilers of the Central Hockey League. In leading the Oilers in scoring and finishing ninth in the CHL league scoring, Costello was loaned to their affiliate and made his AHL debut with the Lake Erie Monsters.

Costello was signed to a one-year contract, alongside Oilers linemate Jack Combs, by the Colorado Eagles of the ECHL on August 18, 2011, for the 2011–12 season. Costello was leading the Eagles and the ECHL in scoring with 76 points in 47 games before he suffered a season-ending knee injury on March 10, 2012. Despite his injury, Costello finished fourth in league scoring and was selected to the First All-Star Team and chosen as the ECHL's Most Valuable Player.

Costello returned to the Eagles the following season and repeated his success scoring 49 points in 27 games. His offensive partnership with Combs was signified when they were both signed to try-out contracts with the Bridgeport Sound Tigers on December 18, 2012. With the conclusion of the NHL lockout inducing significant roster movement, Costello was signed again alongside Combs, to an AHL deal with the Sound Tigers for the remainder of the season on January 9, 2013. In 21 games for the Sound Tigers, Costello produced 12 points, but was unable to find a constant role on the team. He was subsequently released from his AHL contract with the Sound Tigers and rejoined the Colorado Eagles on March 9, 2013.

On August 13, 2013, Costello returned to the CHL as a free agent, signing a one-year contract for the inaugural season of the St. Charles Chill. After only six games with the Chill, Costello was placed on waivers and claimed by the Arizona Sundogs. Costello opted not to report and signed a contract to the ECHL with the Ontario Reign on November 17, 2013.

By the end of 2014, Costello signed with the Allen Americans. He was the ECHL's top scorer with 125 points in 72 games, and went all the way to the Kelly Cup title, scoring two goals and an assist in the decisive game against the South Carolina Stingrays. He renewed with Allen for the following season, being named co-captain with Gary Steffes. Costello again led the league scoring in the 2015–16 season with 103 points, 24 goals and 79 assists.

On May 21, 2017, he signed a try-out contract with the German team Iserlohn Roosters from the Deutsche Eishockey Liga (DEL), rejoining friend and former linemate, Jack Combs. In departing the Americans, Costello left as Allen's franchise leader in goals, assists and points. He left the ECHL after leading the league in scoring for three straight seasons and back-to-back MVPs. In the 2017–18 season, Costello adapted quickly to the European ice posting 27 points in 37 games with the Roosters.

On March 23, 2018, with the conclusion of his contract with Iserlohn, Costello signed as a free agent continuing in the DEL on a one-year deal with Krefeld Pinguine. Following two seasons with the Pinguine, Costello continued his European career by playing on a shortened contract with Norwegian club, Stavanger Oilers of the Eliteserien.

Enjoying four seasons abroad, Costello opted to return to North America for the 2021–22 season, in agreeing to re-join former club, the Allen Americans of the ECHL on September 30, 2021.

On May 18, 2022, Costello announced his retirement from pro hockey, and was announced as the head coach of the Allen Americans

Career statistics

Awards and honours

References

External links

Living people
1986 births
Allen Americans players
American men's ice hockey right wingers
Bridgeport Sound Tigers players
Cedar Rapids RoughRiders players
Colorado Eagles players
Corpus Christi Icerays players
Des Moines Buccaneers players
Iserlohn Roosters players
Krefeld Pinguine players
Lake Erie Monsters players
Muskegon Lumberjacks players
Northeastern Huskies men's ice hockey players
Ontario Reign (ECHL) players
People from Johnston, Iowa
Springfield Falcons players
St. Charles Chill players
Stavanger Oilers players
Texas Wildcatters players
Tulsa Oilers (1992–present) players
Worcester Sharks players
Wichita Falls Wildcats players